Emmanouil Papadopoulos may refer to:

 Emmanouil Papadopoulos (Russian general) (died 1810), Greek officer in Imperial Russian service
 Emmanouil Papadopoulos (water polo player) (fl. 1948), competed in the 1948 Summer Olympics